Kai Schumacher (born 18 November 1979) is a German pianist. He specializes primarily in American piano music of the 20th and 21st century, as well as music for piano and electronics

Life 

Kai Schumacher received his first piano lessons when he was five years old. In 1995 he made his debut at the age of 15 years as a soloist with the Baden-Baden Philharmonic performing the Second Piano Concerto by Dmitri Shostakovich. After graduating from the  he began studying at the Folkwang University of the Arts in Essen in the piano class of Prof. Till Engel. Following his final concert examination, he graduated "with distinction" in 2009.

His first recording, a performance of  The People United Will Never Be Defeated!, a large-scale set of variations by the American composer Frederic Rzewski on a  Chilean revolutionary song, was made the same year and released by Wergo. The album received good reviews both nationally and internationally and was awarded the "Star of the Month" (Stern des Monats) by  magazine. In 2013, he released his second album "Transcriptions" featuring his original arrangements of Grunge, Heavy Metal music, and Indie rock songs for solo piano. In June 2015, Kai Schumacher released "Insomnia" on the SWRmusic/hänssler CLASSIC label, featuring a program of works by George Gershwin, John Cage, George Crumb,  and Bruce Stark.

From 2010-2014 Kai Schumacher was the keyboardist for folk-pop band .

Discography 
 Frederic Rzewski: The People United Will Never Be Defeated! (2009) (Wergo)
 Transcriptions (2013) (Intuition)
 Insomnia (2015) (SWRmusic/HänsslerClassic)
 Walking on a twine (mit Mobilée) (2012) (Island Records / Universal)

References

External links 
 Official Website
 Kai Schumacher Facebook page
 Kai Schumacher YouTube channel
 jazzpages interview

German classical pianists
Male classical pianists
1979 births
Living people
20th-century classical pianists
20th-century German musicians
20th-century German male musicians
21st-century classical pianists
21st-century German musicians
21st-century German male musicians
Folkwang University of the Arts alumni